Selden M. Bronson was a member of the Wisconsin State Assembly in 1881. He was a Republican. Bronson was a bookkeeper by trade. He was born on September 12, 1819, in Suffield, Connecticut.

References

People from Suffield, Connecticut
Republican Party members of the Wisconsin State Assembly
Bookkeepers
1819 births
Year of death missing